Bensdorf is a municipality in the Potsdam-Mittelmark district, in Brandenburg, Germany.

Demography

References

Localities in Potsdam-Mittelmark